Hoppy or Hoppie may refer to:


Fictional characters 
 Hopalong Cassidy, a cowboy in novels and films
 Hoppy (The Flintstones), on the television series The Flintstones
 Hoppie Groenewald, in the 1989 novel The Power of One and the 1992 film adaptation of the same title
 Officer "Hoppy" Hopkins, a recurring character on the television show Sanford and Son
 Hoppy the Marvel Bunny, a comic book character based on Captain Marvel
 Hoppy Uniatz, a sidekick of Simon Templar, aka "The Saint"
 Flying Officer Hoppy Hopkinson, in the movie 633 Squadron
 Hoppy, in the 1994 video game ClayFighter 2: Judgment Clay
 "Hoppy" Thorne, the One-legged Wonder, one of the Manchester United F.C. mascots in the 1930s and 1940s

People 
 Hoppy (nickname), a list of people
 Hoppie van Jaarsveld, South African rugby union player - see List of South Africa national rugby union players

Beverage-related 
 Hoppy (drink), a Japanese non-alcoholic beverage
 the characterization of the taste of hops, a bitter flavoring and stability agent in beer

See also 
 Hopi (disambiguation)
 Hopy, a village in Poland